The 1995–96 season was the 94th season in which Dundee competed at a Scottish national level, playing in the Scottish First Division. Dundee would finish in 5th place, their lowest league position since the 1938–39 season. Dundee would also compete in the Scottish League Cup, the Scottish Cup and the Scottish Challenge Cup, where they were knocked out by Clyde in the 3rd round of the Scottish Cup, and by Stenhousemuir in the quarter-finals of the Challenge Cup. They would make it to the final of the League Cup, before being defeated by Aberdeen at Hampden Park.

Scottish First Division 

Statistics provided by Dee Archive.

League table

Scottish League Cup 

Statistics provided by Dee Archive.

Scottish Cup 

Statistics provided by Dee Archive.

Scottish Challenge Cup 

Statistics provided by Dee Archive.

Player statistics 
Statistics provided by Dee Archive

|}

See also 

 List of Dundee F.C. seasons

References

External links 

 1995–96 Dundee season on Fitbastats

Dundee F.C. seasons
Dundee